Buchanan Sharp (2 November 1894 – 11 January 1956) was a Scottish professional footballer who played for Clydebank Juniors, Vale of Leven, Chelsea, Tottenham Hotspur, Leicester City, Nelson and Southport.

Career 
Sharp began his career with Clydebank Juniors before playing for Vale of Leven. In 1921 he joined Chelsea where he scored 23 goals in 72 appearances overall and was joint top scorer with Harry Ford in the 1922–23 season with 10 goals. The inside forward signed for Tottenham Hotspur in March 1923 and played in three matches for the Spurs. After leaving White Hart Lane, Sharp had spells with Leicester City and Nelson where he featured in 80 matches and scored on 35 occasions. He joined Southport in 1928 and made a further four appearances, scoring once, before ending his footballing career.

Personal life
His uncle James Sharp was also a footballer.

References 

1894 births
1956 deaths
Footballers from West Dunbartonshire
Scottish footballers
English Football League players
Clydebank Juniors F.C. players
Vale of Leven F.C. players
Chelsea F.C. players
Tottenham Hotspur F.C. players
Leicester City F.C. players
Nelson F.C. players
Southport F.C. players
Association football inside forwards
People from Alexandria, West Dunbartonshire